The Communauté urbaine Perpignan Méditerranée Métropole is the communauté urbaine, an intercommunal structure, centred on the city of Perpignan. It is located in the Pyrénées-Orientales department, in the Occitanie region, southern France. It was created in January 2016, replacing the previous communauté d'agglomération Perpignan Méditerranée. Its area is 616.7 km2. Its population was 268,445 in 2018, of which 119,188 in Perpignan proper.

Composition
Perpignan Méditerranée Métropole consists of the following 36 communes:

Baho
Baixas
Le Barcarès
Bompas
Cabestany
Calce
Canet-en-Roussillon
Canohès
Cases-de-Pène
Cassagnes
Espira-de-l'Agly
Estagel
Llupia
Montner
Opoul-Périllos
Perpignan
Peyrestortes
Pézilla-la-Rivière
Pollestres
Ponteilla
Rivesaltes
Sainte-Marie
Saint-Estève
Saint-Féliu-d'Avall
Saint-Hippolyte
Saint-Laurent-de-la-Salanque
Saint-Nazaire
Saleilles
Le Soler
Tautavel
Torreilles
Toulouges
Villelongue-de-la-Salanque
Villeneuve-de-la-Raho
Villeneuve-la-Rivière
Vingrau

See also 

 List of intercommunalities of the Pyrénées-Orientales department

References

Urban communities in France
Intercommunalities of Pyrénées-Orientales